Olga Alexandrovna Budina (born 22 February 1975) is a Russian theater and film actress.

Biography
Olga Budina was born in Odintsovo, Moscow Oblast, Russian SFSR, Soviet Union. She studied history and literature at the Lyceum college. She was actively involved in social work and was a creative student in her school years. She learned to play accordion and piano. The Lyceum Theatre created its own musical "The Princess and the Pea" in which she was a soloist of the school choir and orchestra. She performed at a school dance as a part of amateur vocal and instrumental ensemble, where she was invited as a soloist. After the ninth grade of high school she tried to enter the State School of Music Gnesin. Having failed, she returned to school to obtain secondary (full) general education. While in high school, she graduated from the School of Olga Budina young philology at Moscow State University. Qualified as a category 3 guide, she conducted tours of the Pushkin village Zakharovo located near Odintsova.

A year after graduation, Olga Budina planned to re-enter the Gnessin School, but then changed her mind in favor of the Supreme Shchukin Drama School. Having obtained the maximum score in the entrance test, Olga became a student of the 'University Theater Examination Commission' led by Vladimir Etush.

Artistic Director Olga Budina the Shchukin School became Marina Panteleyeva. The first time was given to Olga Study hard. At the first session, it had suspended all offsets, and even the question was about her dismissal. With a great effort, Olga managed to catch up in their studies, and in the second year, she received the highest score on the actor's skill.

While studying in her second year, Olga Budina received an offer from Mosfilm to work in the short film Game „The Little Prince“. However, the tape did not come out in the rental.

Olga Budina secured her first role as  a movie actress in Gleb Panfilov's film The Romanovs: An Imperial Family, portraying the professional Grand Duchess Anastasia Nikolaevna as a student of the fourth course.

In 2000, Olga Budina gained national popularity in the movie by Alexander Mitta Border: Taiga Novel. In the same year, the film was played at the opening of the Moscow Film Festival XXII.

In 2022 on Russian television she urged russian mothers to prepare their children for the "special military operation" (Ukraine invasion). "Tell your child to learn to shoot and overcome obstacles, to be physically fit," she said

Personal life
Olga Budina was married to businessman Alexander Naumov; they are now divorced. They had a son named Naum.

Filmography

References

External links

Russia Journal.com (531): A First Date With Olga Budina by Dmitry Mozheitov 20 June 2003

1975 births
Living people
People from Odintsovo
Russian stage actresses
Russian television actresses
Russian film actresses
State Prize of the Russian Federation laureates